Domestic support may refer to:
 alimony (domestic support as a synonym)
 domestic support, one of three central concepts of the WTO Agreement on Agriculture